Nancy Zeltsman (born 1958) is an international marimba soloist who has taught at the Boston Conservatory and Berklee College of Music since 1993.

Biography
Zeltsman was born in 1958 in Morristown, New Jersey.

In 1976, Zeltsman studied with Vic Firth at New England Conservatory of Music. Following her sophomore year (1978), she was a percussion fellow at Tanglewood. She took a sabbatical and returned to NEC in 1980 to continue her studies, graduating with a Bachelor of Music (percussion performance) in 1982. She then studied jazz improvisation with Dave Samuels for several years.

She performed in a duo with violinist Sharan Leventhal in the mid-1980s through to the mid-1990s, and in another duo with Janis Potter after the former duo dissolved. She occasionally performs with Jack Van Geem, and a recording she made with him was released in 1994.

In 1993, she was offered a Chair at the Boston Conservatory and Berklee College of Music, where she teaches the marimba exclusively. The japaneses marimba players Eriko Daimo and Nanae Mimura stand out among her successful students. 

Zeltsman also directs the Zeltsman Marimba Festival (ZMF), an annual traveling festival that brings together students and faculty for two weeks of concerts, masterclasses, lessons, and lectures. ZMF commissioned 24 intermediate compositions for the marimba; twelve were written by internationally renowned composers including Gunther Schuller, Michael Tilson Thomas, Steve Stucky, and Paul Simon. The other twelve were chosen from entries in an international composition contest. All works were performed at ZMF 2009 in Appleton, Wisconsin.

Recorded works

"Marimolin" (Marimba/Violin duo with Sharan Leventhal)
 Marimolin (1988),
 Phantasmata (1995, GM Recordings)
 Combo Platter (1994, Catalyst/BMG)

with Jack Van Geem
 Pedro and Olga Learn to Dance (July 2004)

solo
 Woodcuts (1993, GM Recordings)
 See Ya Thursday (1999, Equilibrium)
 Sweet Song (June 2005)

Published works
 Four Mallet Marimba Playing: A Musical Approach for All Levels (2003 Hal Leonard Corporation) .

Contributor to Percussive Notes magazine; Associate Editor of keyboard articles from 1999 through 2001.

References

External links
 Official website
 Boston Conservatory
 ZMF New Music
 Zeltsman Marimba Festival

1958 births
People from Morristown, New Jersey
Living people
American jazz vibraphonists
Marimbists
American percussionists
American women percussionists